The Scent of Blood (also known as The Smell of Blood) is a 2004 Italian thriller-drama film written and directed by Mario Martone. It was screened at the 2004 Cannes Film Festival in the Director's Fortnight section. It is based on a novel by Goffredo Parise.

Cast 

 Fanny Ardant: Silvia 
 Michele Placido: Carlo 
 Giovanna Giuliani: Lù 
 Sergio Tramonti: Sergio 
 Riccardo Scamarcio 
 Francesco Scianna

Production
Towards the beginning of this film there is a unsimulated scene of oral sex, set in the dark room of a nightclub and played by two extras. But rumors talked of about half an hour of cut sequences, also explicit, in which some of the leading actors would be involved.

See also 
 List of Italian films of 2004

References

External links

2004 films
Italian thriller drama films
Films directed by Mario Martone
2004 thriller drama films
2004 drama films
2000s Italian films